The 2019 Rochford District Council election took place on 2 May 2019, to elect members of Rochford District Council in England. This was on the same day as other local elections.

Summary results

No Friends of Rochford (-3.8) candidates as previous.

Ward results

Downhall & Rawreth

Foulness & The Wakerings

Hawkwell East

Hawkwell West

Hockley

Hockley & Ashingdon

Hullbridge

Lodge

Roche North & Rural

Roche South

Sweyne Park & Grange

Trinity

Wheatley

References

2019 English local elections
2019
2010s in Essex
May 2019 events in the United Kingdom